Jesper Ringsborg Christiansen (born 24 April 1978) is a Danish former professional footballer who played as a goalkeeper.

He has previously played for Danish Superliga clubs Odense BK, Vejle BK, Viborg FF, and F.C. Copenhagen, winning four Superliga championships and two Danish Cup trophies with F.C. Copenhagen. He has also played for Scottish Premier League club Rangers.

Christiansen was named the 2005, 2006 and 2007 Danish Goalkeeper of the Year. He has played 11 games for the Denmark national team, and represented Denmark at the 2002 and 2010 FIFA World Cup tournaments as an unused understudy of Thomas Sørensen.

Club career

Danish breakthrough
Born in Roskilde, Christiansen competed with later national team player Peter Madsen to be the best forward on Zealand in his teenage years. At 17, he did not want the life of a professional footballer, and chose to play amateur football in Serie 3, the fourth lowest level of Danish football. For fun, he tried playing the position of goalkeeper, in which position he caught the attention of higher ranking clubs. Roskilde B 1906 offered him a contract in 1997, and he was Roskilde's goalkeeper for one season, before he followed his coach to Ølstykke FC.

In 1998, he moved to Odense Boldklub (OB) in the second tier of Danish football, the Danish 1st Division. He helped OB win promotion to the top-flight Danish Superliga, where he got his national breakthrough. When OB legend Lars Høgh retired in January 2000, a string of strong displays by Christiansen showed a strong temper and good reflexes. He looked the long term replacement of Lars Høgh, though Christiansen never got the chance to make a decent bid for Høgh's record 817 games for OB. As Scottish club Rangers suffered injuries in their goalkeeping staff, the search for replacements turned to Christiansen, who was eager to move abroad at 22 years of age.

On the bench in Glasgow
In Glasgow, he played alongside fellow Dane Peter Løvenkrands, with whom he became good friends, and he played a handful of games in his first time at Rangers, including a few outings in the UEFA Champions League. His league debut was a 3–0 home defeat to Kilmarnock. When first choice goalkeeper Stefan Klos returned from his injury, he once again took control of the goalkeeper spot. Christiansen could not force his way into the starting line-up, and he was put on loan.

His first loan deal with Danish Superliga club Vejle Boldklub in 2001 was a personal success for Christiansen. Though Vejle was relegated to the 1st Division, he was called up to the Danish national team. After the period in Vejle, Christiansen was loaned out to VfL Wolfsburg. This period was one of the worst in his career, the result being that he was dropped from the national team. He did not play a single first team game for Wolfsburg, and did not make many friends in Germany. Christiansen later said he would rather warm the bench at Rangers, than in Wolfsburg.

Danish success
In the winter transfer window of the 2003–04 Superliga season, Christiansen returned to Denmark once more to play for Viborg FF, following a string of goalkeeper switches; former Viborg goalkeeper Arek Onyszko moving to Odense BK, replacing Karim Zaza who had transferred to Brøndby IF. At Viborg, Christiansen showed the impressive form that he had displayed for Odense and Vejle once more.

Following one and a half year at Viborg, Christiansen moved to F.C. Copenhagen (FCK) in the summer of 2005. At FCK, he was assigned the no. 1 jersey as the club's first choice for the goalkeeping position. His debut in the FCK-jersey came on 20 July 2005, keeping a clean sheet as AaB were defeated 1–0 at Aalborg Stadion in Aalborg. In the autumn 2006, he was an important part of FCK's participation in the 2006–07 UEFA Champions League, producing many great saves. This brought renewed interest from foreign clubs, as he and teammate Michael Silberbauer were both rumoured on their way to English club Everton in the 2006 winter transfer window. The transfer never materialized, and in January 2007, Christiansen expressed his desire to further his career by moving to a club in a bigger league, but a new five-year contract cancelled every rumour.

In the opening match of the 2007–08 season, against FC Nordsjælland at Farum Park, Christiansen was close to score on a header, as it hit the inside of the post, and was parried by Nordsjælland keeper Kim Christensen, after a corner kick deep into extra time. In May 2008 he was linked with a £1 million move to West Bromwich Albion. For the 2009–10 season, FCK bought Johan Wiland as a backup. When Christiansen was injured against Brøndby IF in the seventh Superliga game of the season, Wiland replaced him with such success that Christiansen was permanently demoted to the bench. Media reports suggested he wanted a transfer, and when FCK bought Kim Christensen as a new backup keeper in the Summer 2010, Christiansen was expected to leave the club.

He signed for IF Elfsborg of the Allsvenskan championship in June 2010.

International career
During his time with Vejle, Christiansen was called up for the senior national team by national team manager Morten Olsen. He was chosen for the Danish squad at the 2002 FIFA World Cup in South Korea and Japan as a backup for starting national team goalkeeper Thomas Sørensen, and was an unused substitute throughout the tournament.

In his time at Viborg, Christiansen was recalled to the Danish national team, and made his national team debut on 2 June 2005, in a 1–0 friendly match win against Finland. He played his second game in October 2005, when he came on as a substitute in a 2006 FIFA World Cup qualification 2–1 win against Kazakhstan. He quickly established himself as an understudy for Thomas Sørensen, and made a number of appearances at times when Sørensen was injured.

Before the 2010 FIFA World Cup, Christiansen lacked playing time at FCK, and found himself in contention with Kim Christensen for the spot as third goalkeeper in the squad for the finals. Eventually Morten Olsen chose Christiansen for his team, and he spent his time at the tournament as an unused substitute.

Coaching career
After Christiansen left Vendsyssel FF in the summer 2017, he was officially announced as the new assistant manager of Danish 1st Division club AB. In January 2018, he left AB to become goalkeeper coach at Fremad Amager. In 2019, he also functioned as assistant manager for a short period.

On 15 July 2019, it was announced, that Christiansen had left Fremad Amager because he wanted to stay closer to his family and then became the new goalkeeper coach of Viborg FF. In November 2019, Christiansen was on the bench for Viborg in three games, after first keeper, Ellery Balcombe, was banned with a red card and the third and fourth choices was out with injuries, which left Viborg with only Ingvar Jónsson who was able to play. On 13 July 2020, Fremad Amager announced that Christiansen had returned to the club. He left Fremad Amager again in April 2022 as a protest against the club's new owners.

On 21 July 2022, Christiansen joined Nykøbing FC as a goalkeeper coach.

Career statistics

Honours
OB
 Viasat Divisionen: 1998–99

F.C. Copenhagen
 Danish Superliga: 2005–06, 2006–07, 2008–09, 2009–10
 Danish Cup: 2008–09

Individual
 Danish Goalkeeper of the Year: 2005, 2006, 2007
 Danish Team of the Year: 2005, 2006, 2007

References

External links

Career stats, by Danmarks Radio

Danish Superliga statistics

1978 births
Living people
People from Roskilde
Danish men's footballers
Association football goalkeepers
Denmark international footballers
Denmark under-21 international footballers
2002 FIFA World Cup players
2010 FIFA World Cup players
Danish Superliga players
Danish 2nd Division players
Scottish Premier League players
Allsvenskan players
Ølstykke FC players
Odense Boldklub players
Rangers F.C. players
Vejle Boldklub players
VfL Wolfsburg players
Viborg FF players
F.C. Copenhagen players
IF Elfsborg players
Danish expatriate men's footballers
Danish expatriate sportspeople in Scotland
Expatriate footballers in Scotland
Danish expatriate sportspeople in Germany
Expatriate footballers in Germany
Danish expatriate sportspeople in Sweden
Expatriate footballers in Sweden
Danish 1st Division managers
Sportspeople from Region Zealand